The Department of Traditional Affairs (DTA) is a department of the South African government, responsible for overseeing the traditional leadership of South Africa's indigenous communities. Along with the Department of Cooperative Governance, it is within the political responsibility of the Minister of Cooperative Governance and Traditional Affairs (CoGTA), who is assisted by a Deputy Minister of Traditional Affairs.  the minister is Nkosazana Dlamini-Zuma and her deputies are Obed Bapela and Thembi Nkadimeng.

In the 2020 budget, R173.4 million was appropriated for the department. In the 2018/19 financial year it had 95 employees.

References

External links
 

Traditional Affairs
South Africa